Sphenosuchia is a suborder of basal crocodylomorphs that first appeared in the Triassic and occurred into the Middle Jurassic. Most were small, gracile animals with an erect limb posture. They are now thought to be ancestral to crocodyliforms, a group which includes all living crocodilians.

Stratigraphic range

The earliest known members of the group (i.e. Hesperosuchus) are early Norian in age, found in the Blue Mesa Member of the Chinle Formation. Only one sphenosuchian is currently known from the Middle Jurassic, Junggarsuchus, from the Junggar Basin (Shishugou Formation) of China during either the Bathonian or the Callovian (~165 Ma) age, and the Hallopodidae are known from the Late Jurassic of North America.

Phylogeny

The monophyly of the group is debated, although several synapomorphies characterize the clade, including extremely slender limbs, a compact carpus and an elongate coracoid process.

In 2002, Clark and Sues found a possible sphenosuchian clade of Dibothrosuchus, Sphenosuchus, and possibly Hesperosuchus and Saltoposuchus, with several other genera in unresolved positions (Kayentasuchus, Litargosuchus, Pseudhesperosuchus, and Terrestrisuchus). More recently, however, Clark et al. (2004) argued for the paraphyly of the group, contending that morphological characters were secondarily lost in more highly derived crocodylomorphs. Further analysis and study is required before the group's monophyly is resolved with certainty — a perfect phylogenetic analysis is, at present, impossible due to a paucity of fossil remains demonstrating phylogenetically informative characters.

Below is a cladogram modified from Nesbitt (2011). Sphenosuchians are marked by the green bracket.

Genera

References

Terrestrial crocodylomorphs
Triassic crocodylomorpha
Jurassic crocodylomorphs
Paraphyletic groups